The 1995 City of Aberdeen Council election took place on 6 April 1995 to elect members of City of Aberdeen Council. The Council would later change its name on 9 May to become "Aberdeen City Council."

The results saw Labour retain its control of the council, with a increased majority of seats.

Election results

Ward results

References

1995
1995 Scottish local elections
20th century in Aberdeen